Redwoodtown is a suburb to the south of Blenheim's central business district.

Demographics

Redwoodtown had a population of 10,401 at the 2018 New Zealand census, an increase of 681 people (7%) since the 2013 census, and an increase of 1,017 people (10.8%) since the 2006 census. There were 4,302 households. There were 5,028 males and 5,370 females, giving a sex ratio of 0.94 males per female, with 1,833 people (17.6%) aged under 15 years, 1,755 (16.9%) aged 15 to 29, 4,431 (42.6%) aged 30 to 64, and 2,373 (22.8%) aged 65 or older.

Ethnicities were 84.8% European/Pākehā, 14.2% Māori, 4.5% Pacific peoples, 5.5% Asian, and 2.5% other ethnicities (totals add to more than 100% since people could identify with multiple ethnicities).

The proportion of people born overseas was 17.8%, compared with 27.1% nationally.

Although some people objected to giving their religion, 51.4% had no religion, 37.5% were Christian, 0.9% were Hindu, 0.2% were Muslim, 0.9% were Buddhist and 2.0% had other religions.

Of those at least 15 years old, 1,143 (13.3%) people had a bachelor or higher degree, and 2,076 (24.2%) people had no formal qualifications. The employment status of those at least 15 was that 4,164 (48.6%) people were employed full-time, 1,200 (14.0%) were part-time, and 213 (2.5%) were unemployed.

Education
Richmond View is a state integrated school with a Christian perspective.

Whitney Street School is a state contributing primary (Year 1-6) primary school.

All these schools are coeducational. Rolls are as of

References

Suburbs of Blenheim, New Zealand